Adi Ashkenazi (born 23 March 1975) is an Israeli actress, comedian and television host.

Biography
Ashkenazi was born in Herzliya, Israel. Her Sephardic Jewish family immigrated to Israel from Turkey. She studied acting at the Beit Tzvi School for Performing Arts. In 2004, Ashkenazi divorced the actor Coby Doron after three years of marriage. In 2010, she was arrested for illegal possession of drugs, but released immediately. In 2010, it was announced that she was pregnant by her boyfriend of six months, Eitan Ben Zakan. She gave birth to a baby girl in April 2011 and in November 2012 she gave birth to a baby son.

Media career
After graduating from Beit Zvi, she hosted children's shows on Israeli TV's Channel One. In 2000 she appeared in a renewed version of the humour show Domino Gros, together with Maya Dagan and Anat Magen. In 2002, she performed on Yair Lapid's talk show. She managed the comic part of the show and presented a stand-up show together with Maya Dagan. In 2004, she won the "Entertainment woman of the year" prize. In 2006, she was named "Television woman of the year" at the "People of the year" ceremony on Channel Two.

Ashkenazi is the star of "What's that nonsense?".

References

External links
 
 Adi Ashkenazi, in the Israeli website ROFL 

1975 births
Israeli people of Turkish-Jewish descent
Living people
Beit Zvi School for the Performing Arts alumni
Israeli television actresses
People from Herzliya
Israeli television presenters
Israeli women television presenters